Adirondack Architecture refers to the rugged architectural style generally associated with the Great Camps within the Adirondack Mountains area in New York. The builders of these camps used native building materials and sited their buildings within an irregular wooded landscape.  These camps for the wealthy were built to provide a primitive, rustic appearance while avoiding the problems of in-shipping materials from elsewhere.

Elements
Elements such as whole, split, or peeled logs, bark, roots, and burls, along with native granite fieldstone, were used to build interior and exterior components.  Massive fireplaces and chimneys built of cut stone are also common within the Great Camp architecture.  The use of native building materials was not only for promoting a natural appearance, but also to avoid the expense of transporting conventional building materials into a remote location.

Influences
The style drew upon Swiss chalet architecture, which had been introduced to America by Andrew Jackson Downing around 1850.  Log construction was popularized by Downing's protégé, Calvert Vaux, in his pattern book Villas and Cottages in 1857.  Downing's design principles emphasized utility, structural expression, and conformity to natural surroundings.  The building form was influenced by Stick style, but using log framing instead of dimensional lumber to express the structural system of the buildings.  Charles Eastlake's book Hints on Household Taste in Furniture, Upholstery and other Details also influenced the Adirondack rustic style.  Interior decorations such as rustic and Mission Style furniture, mounted trophies of fish and game, Japanese fans and screens, and American Indian artifacts were influenced by Eastlake's ideas.

Camp Santanoni, Newcomb, New York, built for Robert C. Pruyn of Albany, was the first Adirondack camp to be comprehensively designed as a unit by a professional architect, Robert Henderson Robertson of New York, who designed the Main Camp Complex.

Style
The Adirondacks buildings were recognized for their rugged finish and outstanding craftsmanship especially by the wealthy locals. The Adirondacks style of architecture can be specialized into custom homes, rugged roofing, log cabins, boat houses, rustic furnishing, rustic kitchen, birch and cedar furniture, log and twig works.

This style of architecture is found most prominently in and around the area of Adirondack Park.

References

External links
Adirondack Architectural Heritage

See also

 Vernacular architecture
 Great Camps
 Sagamore Camp
 Santanoni Preserve
 Adirondack Park

American architectural styles
 01
Rustic architecture in the United States
American Craftsman architecture